The Domino Frill is a breed of fancy pigeon. Domino Frills, along with other varieties of domesticated pigeons, are all descendants from the rock pigeon (Columba livia).

See also 

List of pigeon breeds

References 

Pigeon breeds